The Southern Baptists of Texas Convention (SBTC) is an association of conservative Southern Baptist churches in Texas. It is supportive of the national Southern Baptist Convention. It was formed by churches within the Baptist General Convention of Texas  so that they might partner more closely with the SBC in a fellowship based on a common commitment to the inerrancy of Scripture.

History 

The earliest precursor to the SBTC was the Conservative Baptist Fellowship of Texas. Members of that fellowship joined other conservative Southern Baptists to form the Southern Baptists of Texas in 1995.  This group operated within the Baptist General Convention of Texas (BGCT) until a new entity the Southern Baptists of Texas Convention was founded in 1998.

The groups that preceded the new convention sought closer cooperation between the BGCT and the SBC than existed during the "Conservative Resurgence" of the national body. However, the BGCT's refusal to endorse the more conservative leanings of the SBC leadership led the Southern Baptists of Texas to organize a separate state convention in November 1998. The new state convention, though autonomous, immediately formed closer partnerships with the entities of the SBC.

The SBTC believes in the inerrancy of Scripture, salvation only in Jesus Christ, and the primacy of the local church. The SBTC established missions and evangelism as its major emphases. The SBTC adopted the 2000 SBC Baptist Faith and Message as its own statement of faith. The SBTC's purpose, according to its mission statement, is to "facilitate, extend, and enlarge the Great Commission of the Southern Baptist Convention and Southern Baptist churches and associations of Texas."

The SBTC's headquarters are in a 30,000 ft² (2,800 m2) facility, opened in 2004, in Grapevine, Texas. Nathan Lorick serves as the executive director. Its official publication is the Southern Baptist Texan and Gary Ledbetter currently serves as its editor.

As of January 2018, 2,565 churches are affiliated with the SBTC. SBTC affiliated churches may be either "uniquely affiliated" (solely affiliated with SBTC) or "dually affiliated" (affiliated with both SBTC and another Baptist group, not necessarily BGCT).  However, a church must agree with the 2000 BF&M as a condition of affiliation.

Several new Baptist associations have formed by SBTC churches (one being the North Texas Baptist Association, serving the Dallas-Fort Worth area), though the SBTC itself does not promote their formation. Most SBTC churches choose to remain in longtime associations.

Affiliations
The SBTC does not own and operate any institutions of higher education or any other form of ministry.  However, it has affiliations with entities that are owned by other groups.  Under the terms of the affiliation agreements, the institutions are partially funded through SBTC's budget and SBTC has representation on the affiliated entity's board.

Higher education
The SBTC has affiliations with two institutions of higher education:
Criswell College in Dallas, originally owned by First Baptist Church of Dallas but now independent of them. Criswell College offers fully accredited Bachelors and Master's degrees including the Master of Divinity (M.Div). The college is known for its emphases on sharing the Gospel of Jesus Christ, Biblical inerrancy, and teaching students to view all academic disciplines through a Christian worldview.
Jacksonville College, an accredited junior college located in Jacksonville, Texas. Jacksonville College was begun by and is owned by the Baptist Missionary Association of Texas, the state denomination for the Baptist Missionary Association of America, which is a separate denomination from the SBC.

Other affiliated ministries
The SBTC also has an affiliation with Texas Baptist Home for Children, a children's home that also works with foster parents, located in Waxahachie, Texas.  The home is owned by the Baptist Missionary Association of Texas.

SBTC previously had, but now no longer has, an affiliation with East Texas Baptist Family Ministries, a ministry begun by churches in East Texas, located outside of Timpson, Texas.

Sources 
 Herb Hollinger, November 25, 1997, Texas Baptist leaders respond to new convention, BP News.

References

External links 
 

Organizations based in Texas
Baptist Christianity in Texas
Conventions associated with the Southern Baptist Convention
Christian organizations established in 1998
Baptist denominations established in the 20th century